Kitchama is a village located in Baramulla district of Jammu and Kashmir union territory of India. The village has two adjoining areas namely "Sheeri" and "Gantamulla" 
It is located 0 km towards west from District headquarters Baramulla. 52 km from State capital Srinagar Kashmir 
its also famous for a foreigner graveyard.

References 

Villages in Baramulla district